Louis Leitz (2 May 1846 – 18 May 1918) was a German inventor and founder of Esselte Leitz GmbH & Co KG, trained as a woodturner and also worked as a mechanic.

Biography 
Leitz was born in Ingersheim. In 1896 he made some important changes in development of ring binders in Stuttgart-Feuerbach. Leitz introduced the "finger hole" on the side of the binder to aid removal from crowded shelves, thereby creating the modern ring binder.  Leitz died in Stuttgart.

Louis Leitz Foundation was founded in his memory on the 30 November 2001. The foundation's budget is Euro 120,000  p.a.

References

1846 births
1918 deaths
19th-century German inventors